Daya : Chentheeyil Chalicha Kumkumapottu was  an Indian television drama series premiered on 1 November 2021 on Asianet and digital platform, Disney+ Hotstar. It is produced by Endemol Shine, it stars Pallavi Gowda in the title role. The show talks about the social topic of Woman empowerment. The show aired its last episode on 26 November 2022.

Synopsis
The show is about a bold lady named Daya, a brave girl, does not fear anything and believes in taking on challenges head-on. She along with her mother, navigate life as they go through thick and thin together.

Cast
Pallavi Gowda as Daya Jeevan, Jeevan's wife, Kaithakkal Achuthan and Janaki's daughter
Sarath Das as Sub Collector Rendeep IAS
Sayoojya's husband and Allimol's father.
 Sandeep Mohan as Jeevan, Daya's husband
MLA Chemberi Vishwanathan and Mallika's son
Dayana Hameed as Sayoojya Rendeep
Rendeep's second wife
Kaithakkal Achuthan and Kamala's daughter
Sreelakshmi as Janaki
V.K.Baiju as Kaithakkal Achuthan
Daya, Sayoojya and Deepak's father
Kamala's husband
John Jacob as Kaithakkal Deepak
Kaithakkal Achuthan and Kamala's son
Daya and Sayoojya's elder brother
Reshmi Boban as Kamala
Kaithakkal Achuthan's wife
Deepak and Sayoojya's mother
Baby Ester Evana Sherin as Allimol
Rendeep and Lekshmi's daughter
Shyjan Sreevalsam as Panchayth Member Chanthunni aka "Onthunni"
Prajusha as Maya
Thirumala Ramachandran as Narayanan
Ajith Vijayan as MLA Chemberi Vishwanathan
Jeevan's father
Shobha Mohan as Mallika
Jeevan's Mother
Nandhana as Aravi
Amith as Harigovindhan
Rendeep's father-in-law
Lekshmi's father
Sunil Vikram as Murukan
Jaseela Parveen as Swarnalekha
Sanuraj Sanu as Rocky
Rajeev Pala
T. P. Madhavan
Rugmini Amma
Stella Raja
Lekshmy Nandan as Kajol
Sreelekshmi Haridas
Praveen Prem
Kiran Iyer

Reception
In a poll conducted on the official Instagram account of ETimes TV to pick the best entertainer between Daya: Chentheeyil Chalicha Kumkumapottu and Amma Makal, 78% of the respondents voted in favour of Daya.

References

External links
 Daya: Chentheeyil Chalicha Kumkumapottu at Disney+ Hotstar

2021 Indian television series debuts
Asianet (TV channel) original programming
Malayalam-language television shows